Lauterhofen is a municipality in the district of Neumarkt in Bavaria in Germany.

Notable people 
 Engelbert Niebler (1921-2006), from 1975 to 1987 a judge at the Federal Constitutional Court and Honorary Professor of the University of Munich
 Frederick V (1596-1632), Count Palatine and Elector of the Palatinate from 1610 to 1623 and King of Bohemia (as Frederick I) from 1619 to 1620
 Max Sturm (1891-1958) composer, pianist, chorus and music teacher in Amberg

References

Neumarkt (district)